Margaret of Bourbon or Marguerite de Bourbon may refer to:

 Margaret of Bourbon, Queen of Navarre (c. 1217 – 1256), Queen of Navarre from 1232 to 1253 as the third wife of Theobald I of Navarre; regent for three years following his death
 Margaret of Clermont (1289–1309), daughter of Robert, Count of Clermont and Beatrice of Burgundy, Lady of Bourbon; wife of Raymond Berengar, Count of Andria and John I, Marquis of Namur
 Margaret of Bourbon (1313–1362), daughter of Louis I, Duke of Bourbon and Mary of Avesnes; wife of Jean II, sire of Sully and Hutin de Vermeilles
 Margaret of Bourbon, Lady of Albret (1344–1416), daughter of Peter I, Duke of Bourbon and Isabella of Valois, Duchess of Bourbon; wife of Arnaud Amanieu, Lord of Albret
 Margaret of Bourbon (1438–1483), daughter of Charles I, Duke of Bourbon and Agnes of Burgundy, Duchess of Bourbon; wife of Philip II, Duke of Savoy
 Margaret of Bourbon (1516–1559), daughter of Charles, Duke of Vendôme and Françoise d'Alençon; wife of Francis I, Duke of Nevers
 Margaret of Valois (1553-1615), daughter of Henry II, King of France and Catherine de' Medici; ex-wife of Henry IV, King of France. As her brother, Henry III, King of France, was also Duke of Bourbon before succeeding to the throne in 1574, she was counted in the list as well
 Marguerite de Bourbon (b. 1556), daughter of Louis I, Prince of Condé and Éléonore de Roye; died young
 Marguerite Louise d'Orléans (1645-1721), daughter of Gaston, Duke of Orléans and Marguerite of Lorraine; wife of Cosimo III de' Medici, Grand Duke of Tuscany. As a granddaughter of Henry IV, King of France, she was counted in the list as well
 Élisabeth Marguerite d'Orléans (1646-1696), daughter of Gaston, Duke of Orléans and Marguerite of Lorraine; wife of Louis Joseph, Duke of Guise. As a granddaughter of Henry IV, King of France, she was counted in the list as well
 Princess Margherita of Bourbon-Parma (1847-1893), daughter of Charles III, Duke of Parma and Princess Louise d'Artois; wife of Infante Carlos, Duke of Madrid
 Infanta Margarita, Duchess of Soria (b. 1939), daughter of Infante Juan, Count of Barcelona and Princess María de las Mercedes of Bourbon-Two Sicilies; wife of Carlos Zurita, Duke of Soria
 Princess Margarita de Bourbon de Parme (b. 1972), daughter of Carlos Hugo, Duke of Parma and Princess Irene of the Netherlands; ex-wife of Edwin de Roy van Zuydewijn and wife of Tjalling ten Cate
 Margot d'Albert (b. 2005), daughter of Philippe d'Albert, 13th Duke of Luynes and Capucine Ubald-Bocquet. As a descendant of Louis, Count of Soissons (who came from House of Bourbon-Condé), she was counted in the list as well
 Princess Louise-Marguerite d'Orléans (b. 2014), daughter of Jean, Count of Paris and Philomena, Countess of Paris. As a granddaughter of Henri, Count of Paris (1933–2019), who came from the House of Orléans (a cadet branch in the House of Bourbon), she was counted in the list as well